Literally, Right Before Aaron is a 2017 American comedy film written and directed by Ryan Eggold. The film stars Justin Long, Cobie Smulders, Ryan Hansen, John Cho, Kristen Schaal, Dana Delany, Peter Gallagher, Lea Thompson and Luis Guzmán. The film had its world premiere at the Tribeca Film Festival on April 22, 2017. The film was released on September 29, 2017, by Screen Media Films.

Plot
Adam and Allison were college sweethearts. Adam is heartbroken when she breaks up with him, then finds himself in the odd predicament of being a "dear friend" invited to her wedding a year and a half later. At the rehearsal dinner, he is introduced by another friend as the guy who dated Allison "...literally, right before Aaron", the groom, started dating her. This leads to a sequence of events that eventually leads to Aaron chasing after him during the reception until he enters a bus and leaves.

Cast

Release
The film premiered at the Tribeca Film Festival on April 22, 2017. On May 24, 2017, Screen Media Films acquired distribution rights to the film. The film was released on September 29, 2017, by Screen Media Films.

Reception
The review aggregator website Rotten Tomatoes gives the film a rating of 25% based on 20 reviews, with an average rating of 3.75/10.

References

External links
 
 
 

2017 films
2017 comedy films
American comedy films
2017 directorial debut films
Features based on short films
2010s English-language films
2010s American films